Macrochenus tonkinensis is a species of beetle in the family Cerambycidae. It was described by Per Olof Christopher Aurivillius in 1920. It is known from Vietnam and China.

References

Lamiini
Beetles described in 1920